Damansara was a federal constituency in the Federal Territories, Malaysia, that was represented in the Dewan Rakyat from 1974 to 1986.

The federal constituency was created in the 1974 redistribution and was mandated to return a single member to the Dewan Rakyat under the first past the post voting system.

History

Representation history

Election results

References

Defunct Federal Territories of Malaysia federal constituencies